The 1969 Western Kentucky football team represented Western Kentucky University during the 1969 NCAA College Division football season. The team was led by coach Jimmy Feix, in his second season as coach, the Hilltoppers compiled an overall record of 6–3–1 with a mark of 5–2 in conference play, placing second in the OVC. The team's captains were Romeo Crennel and Bill Rose.

Schedule

References

Western Kentucky
Western Kentucky Hilltoppers football seasons
Western Kentucky Hilltoppers football